Matej Kochan (born 21 November 1992) is a Slovak professional footballer who currently plays for Fortuna Liga club Ružomberok.

Club career

FO ŽP Šport Podbrezová
He made his Fortuna Liga debut for ŽP Šport Podbrezová in a Fortuna liga fixture against Slovan Bratislava on 11 July 2014. Slovan won the game 2:1.

References

External links
 
 ŽP Šport Podbrezová profile
 Eurofotbal profile

1992 births
Living people
Sportspeople from Brezno
Slovak footballers
Slovakia under-21 international footballers
Association football midfielders
FK Železiarne Podbrezová players
MFK Ružomberok players
2. Liga (Slovakia) players
Slovak Super Liga players